Kings International College is a secondary school in Camberley, Surrey near junction 4 of the M3 Motorway. The college has around 680 students, with 50 teaching staff and 30 associate staff. Opened in 2001 on the site of France Hill School; the college is currently designated a specialist Business and Enterprise College status by the Department for Children, Schools and Families.

History
Kings International College was opened on the site of the previous France Hill School in September 2001. The relaunch came as a result of a partnership between 3E's enterprises (a non-profit educational company based at the CTC Kingshurst in Birmingham) and Surrey County Council. It was intended that the relaunch would address the falling rolls and a financial deficit that existed at the time. The project was partially successful in that the rolls did increase initially, but the national decline in student numbers after 2002, which impact until approximately 2014, mean that the college is not full, although by 2018 it is predicted there will be insufficient places in the area and the College may need to increase its capacity.

France Hill House school was opened in France Hill Drive, Camberley, in the 1940s.  It moved to a brand new building in Watchetts Drive in the summer of 1958, retaining part of its original name by becoming France Hill County Secondary School. The original buildings were retained for some years, accommodating rising rolls in the 1960s.  Later the old buildings were taken over by what had been Yorktown and Camberley junior and primary schools.

In March 2011, Surrey County Council proposed that Tomlinscote School take over the Kings International School and that years 7, 8 and 9 be based on the Kings site and 10, 11 and 6th form on the Tomlinscote site. Initial meetings with parents at both schools suggested united opposition to the plans and sparked an internet debate. The school used to be in a 'soft federation' with Tomlinscote school.

Curriculum
The school is one of few state schools currently offering the International Baccalaureate. In years 7-11 the curriculum covers all the requirements of the National Curriculum and students are routinely entered for GCSE and other qualifications from year 9 onwards. The school is the only school in Surrey Heath that enters students for a GCSE in Humanities a year early. This allows students to gain exam experience before entering their GCSE years.  The college is also a member of SHAPE (the Surrey Heath Area Partnership for Education) which is working towards effective collaboration in the curriculum across all the secondary schools in the borough.

GCSE results
In 2005, the school achieved a 63% pass rate of students receiving 5 A*-C grades, rising further in 2006, with 66% of students gaining the national standard. In the last three years the results have been consistently around 55% gaining 5 A*-C with 40-43% gaining this standard with Maths and English.

Catchment
Kings International students arrive from over 20 different primary schools in the area. The Watchetts Junior School in Camberley is the most local feeder, providing about 30% of the students, while other schools from across the borough of Surrey Heath provide the majority. There are also about 10% of students who cross from neighbouring Hampshire and Berkshire schools given the proximity of Camberley to the county boundaries.

In recent years the college has experienced increasing cultural diversity. The local settlement of many ex-Gurkha families, for example, has meant that the College has about 10% students of Nepalese origin and this has resulted in an international partnership with a Nepalese school.

Projects 
The school is regularly featured on local news channels for its projects, most recently for its involvement in a back pain project. In 2004 a selection of students constructed a life-size replica of a World War II panther tank made from wood, this was followed by a project in 2006 where a life size replica of an early aircraft was constructed.

Facilities
The college buildings date from the late 1950s with the vast majority of classrooms located in one and two storey buildings around a central 'quad'. Significant refurbishment of some of the buildings was undertaken in 2001 including the addition of a  cyber cafe. The site is quite large for the number of students and there are extensive playing fields. Sport is further catered for with a swimming pool, an AstroTurf and a newly regenerated sports hall complex on site.   
   
There are data projectors in nearly all classrooms and interactive whiteboards in more than 50% of the rooms. The college has large well equipped drama and dance studios. The drama studio was completely refurbished in 2013. The site is heavily used by the local community in the evenings for a range of adult education classes. Camberley Athletics club and Camberley & Farnborough Hockey Club are both located on site and the college has very strong links to the neighbouring Rugby and Cricket clubs. The Beacon church is also a user of the facilities on a Sunday morning.

Alumni
 Paul Darke,  academic, artist and disability rights activist attended France Hill School
 Alex Matthews. England Rugby International. Women's Rugby World Cup Winner 2014

References

External links
 Official website

Secondary schools in Surrey
Educational institutions established in 2001
Camberley
Foundation schools in Surrey
2001 establishments in England